The Four Lovers was a band formed in 1956 that was the result of vocalist Frankie Valli joining The Variatones (Tommy DeVito, lead guitar; James Gregorio Valeo, then Henry Majewski, rhythm guitar; Frank Cottone, accordion; and Billy Thompson, drums) in 1954. The Four Lovers achieved minor success before a name change to The Four Seasons in 1960. During those five years, group members also included Nicolas DeVito (vocals, electric bass), Hugh Garrity (vocals, guitar), Charles Calello (bass), Nick Massi (bass, vocals), Bob Gaudio (keyboards, vocals), and Philip Mongiovi (drums)

History

RCA, 1956–1958
The Four Lovers' big break came in early 1956 when backing up a female singer's audition for two New York record men. One of the two record men, Peter Paul, was suitably impressed enough to become their manager. A week later, they were themselves auditioning for RCA. RCA signed them up that day and the group selected a new name, The Four Lovers. The group that ended up recording as The Four Lovers was Frankie Valli (lead vocal, drums), Thomas DeVito (vocal, guitar), Philip Mongiovi (Drums), Henry Majewski (vocal, guitar) and Nicolas DeVito (vocal, bass).

The quartet released seven singles and one album under the Four Lovers name, with only their debut single, Otis Blackwell's "You're the Apple of My Eye" achieving significant national  sales to appear on the Billboard Hot 100 singles chart. The single got them their first national television appearance, on The Ed Sullivan Show in 1956.

RCA gave up on the Four Lovers when the group's fifth straight single failed to chart in 1957 and finally dropped the group from its label.  The group promptly signed to Epic Records but was quickly dropped when its first single for the label also failed to chart.  As a consequence, the discouraged group temporarily disbanded.

Bob Crewe, 1958–1960
In 1958, Valli met record producer Bob Crewe at a recording session, who signed the Four Lovers to a three-year artist contract. During this period, the reconstituted quartet had some significant personnel changes, as bassist/vocalist Nick DeVito left the group in 1958, to be replaced by Nick Massi for just a few months, then by bassist/arranger Charles Calello until 1960, and then by Massi again.  Meanwhile, guitarist/vocalist Henry Majewski was replaced by Hugh Garrity for a few months in 1958, and then by keyboardist/guitarist/vocalist/songwriter Bob Gaudio in 1959.  The Four Lovers worked steadily as session artists, primarily as background singers and background musicians, in addition to resuming their live performances in various clubs and lounges between New York City and Philadelphia)

In addition, their contract with Crewe allowed them to record individually or collectively for Crewe's Peri Records — which they did under more than a handful of "stage names".

By the end of this contract, the Four Lovers had become a complete outfit with an "in-house" composer and an associated producer and arranger.  They were no longer dependent on outside songwriters to provide them with hits. In mid-1960, as the contract was expiring, a failed audition at a New Jersey bowling establishment led to a handshake agreement between Valli and Gaudio that signified a change: the Four Lovers were no more, and The Four Seasons Partnership was founded.  By the end of 1962, the quartet of Valli, Gaudio, Massi, and Tommy DeVito would have two singles reach the top spot on the Hot 100.

Discography

Singles credited to The Four Lovers (1956–1957)

 1956
 "You're the Apple of My Eye"/"The Girl in My Dreams" – RCA Victor

 "Honey Love"/"Please Don't Leave Me" – RCA Victor

 "Jambalaya (On the Bayou)"/"Be Lovey Dovey" – RCA Victor

 1957
 "Never Never"/"Happy Am I" – RCA Victor

 "Shake a Hand"/"The Stranger" – RCA Victor

 "The Stranger"/"Night Train" – RCA Victor

 "My Life for your Love"/"Pucker Up" – Epic

Singles released under other names (1958–1960)
 1958
 "I Go Ape"/"If You Care" (as Frankie Tyler) – Okeh

 1959
 "Please Take a Chance"/"It May Be Wrong" (as Frankie Vally) – Decca
 "Come Si Bella" (as Franke Valle and the Romans)/"Real (This Is Real)" (as Frankie Valley) – Cindy
 "Too Young to Start"/"Red Lips" (as The Village Voices) – Topix/Peri

 1960
 "Spanish Lace"/"1,000,000 Tears" (Bob Gaudio as Turner Disentri) – Topix/Peri
 "I Am All Alone"/"Trance" (as Billy Dixon and The Topics) – Topix/Peri
 "An Angel Cried"/"Hope, Faith and Dreams" (as Harold Miller and The Rays) – Topix/Peri
 "Lost Lullaby"/"Trance" (as Billy Dixon and The Topics) – Topix/Peri
 "Betty Jean"/"More Lovin' Less Talkin'" (as Johnny Halo) – Topix/Peri

Albums

Joyride
RCA Victor LPM 1317, released September 1956 (reissued in 1978 as RCA LP 7131). It is a collection of cover versions with a few originals tossed in. A variety of musical styles are represented here, rhythm and blues ("This Is My Story" and "Lawdy Miss Clawdy", the latter a Lloyd Price chestnut), western ("San Antonio Rose", later a hit for Floyd Cramer), pop ("For Sentimental Reasons" and "Memories of You"), and early rock'n'roll (their version of "White Christmas" and "Such a Night", both popularized by The Drifters).

The Four Lovers
Rhino R2 90142 (CD), released July 1993. This is essentially a reissue of a 1989 German compilation album (The Four Lovers 1956) with a few alternate takes thrown in. In addition to the complete contents of the Joyride album and a few songs that were recorded in the Joyride sessions, the CD contains all songs that The Four Lovers released as singles on RCA Victor. Thus it contains the entire Four Lovers output except the two sides on their 1957 Epic single ("My Life for Your Love" and "Pucker Up").

 "What Is This Thing Called Love"
 "Joyride"
 "Such a Night"
 "The Girl in My Dreams"
 "The Stranger"
 "Diddilly Diddilly Babe"
 "Shake a Hand"
 "Please Don't Leave Me"
 "You're the Apple of My Eye"
 "White Christmas"
 "It's Too Soon to Know"
 "San Antonio Rose"
 "Night Train"
 "Cimarron"
 "Lawdy Miss Clawdy"
 "This Is My Story"
 "(I Love You) For Sentimental Reasons"
 "I Want a Girl (Just Like the Girl That Married Dear Old Dad)"
 "Jambalaya (On the Bayou)"
 "Be Lovey Dovey"
 "Love Sweet Love"
 "Happy Am I"
 "Never Never"
 "Honey Love"
 "(I Love You) For Sentimental Reasons (Take 1)"
 "White Christmas (Take 1)"
 "The Girl in My Dreams (Take 4)"
 "Diddilly Diddilly Babe (Take 9)"
 "Such a Night (Take 1)"
 "Honey Love (Take 1)"

References

1956 establishments in New Jersey
American rhythm and blues musical groups
Musical groups disestablished in 1960
Musical groups established in 1956
RCA Victor artists